The Russia House is a 1990 American spy film directed by Fred Schepisi and starring Sean Connery, Michelle Pfeiffer, Roy Scheider, James Fox, John Mahoney, Klaus Maria Brandauer and director Ken Russell. Tom Stoppard wrote the screenplay based on John le Carré's 1989 novel of the same name. It was the first US motion picture to be shot substantially on location in the Soviet Union.

Plot
Bartholomew "Barley" Scott-Blair (Sean Connery), the head of a British publishing firm, arrives in Moscow on business. At a writers' retreat near Peredelkino, he speaks of an end to tensions with the West, heard by the mysterious "Dante" (Klaus Maria Brandauer), who demands that Barley promise to do the right thing if the opportunity arises.

A few months later, unable to locate Barley at a trade show, a young Soviet named Katya Orlova (Michelle Pfeiffer) asks publisher Nicky Landau (Nicholas Woodeson) to give Barley a manuscript. Landau sneaks a look and delivers it to British government authorities. The manuscript is a document detailing the Soviet Union's capability for waging nuclear war. An investigation reveals "Dante" is renowned Soviet physicist Yakov Efraimovich Saveleyev, author of the manuscript.

British intelligence officers track Barley to his holiday flat in Lisbon and interrogate him about his ties to Katya, but realize he knows as little as they do. MI6 realizes the manuscript is also of vital importance to the CIA, with both agencies seeking Barley to work on their behalf.  British agent Ned (James Fox) gives Barley some fundamental training as a spy.

Barley returns to the Soviet Union to seek out Dante and confirm he is a genuine informant. He meets with Katya and is instantly smitten. Through her, he confirms that Dante is indeed Saveleyev, and he also denies to Katya that he is a spy.

The British run the operation through its first phase while apprising the CIA of its results. The CIA team, headed by Russell (Roy Scheider), is concerned at the manuscript's description of the Soviet nuclear missile programme in complete disarray and suggests the United States has engaged in a pointless arms race.

Katya sets up a meeting with Yakov, going to great lengths to avoid being followed. Barley explains that the manuscript is in the hands of British and American authorities. Yakov feels betrayed, but Barley convinces him that the manuscript can still be published, and is given another volume of the manuscript after assuring Yakov he is sympathetic to the scientist's cause.

Impressed by the additional volume, Russell's boss Brady (John Mahoney) and U.S. military officer Quinn (J. T. Walsh) interrogate Barley to be certain of his loyalties.

Convinced the manuscripts are truthful, the CIA and MI6 create a "shopping list" of questions to extract as much strategic warfare information as Dante can provide. "Russia House" handler Ned senses something is amiss with Barley, but the British-American team continues its plans.

Barley returns to the Soviet Union and declares his love to Katya, admitting he is an operative. Katya confesses that Yakov is not acting like himself and fears he may be under KGB observation or control.  She gives Barley Yakov's address in Moscow.

Under full British-American surveillance, Barley takes the shopping list to Yakov's apartment. Ned suddenly concludes that the Soviets know all about the operation and will steal the list to learn what the British and Americans know, and is convinced that Barley has made a deal to turn over the questions to the KGB. Russell disagrees, and instructs the mission to proceed as planned. The meeting with Yakov is expected to be brief, but after seven hours, Russell admits he was wrong. The team must now pretend the questions were deliberately false.

Barley sends a note to Ned explaining that during a pre-arranged phone call to Katya, Dante used a code word to let her know that he had been compromised by the KGB and that her life was in danger. Barley admits he traded the shopping list to the Soviets, in exchange for the release of Katya and her family to the West. He admits his actions might be unfair, but tells Ned, "You shouldn't open other people's letters."

Ned visits Barley, who has returned to his flat in Lisbon, to wait for Katya. When her ship arrives, Barley greets Katya and her family at the docks, ready to begin a new life with them.

Cast
 Sean Connery as Bartholomew "Barley" Scott Blair
 Michelle Pfeiffer as Katya Orlova
 Roy Scheider as Russell
 James Fox as Ned
 John Mahoney as Brady
 Michael Kitchen as Clive
 J. T. Walsh as Colonel Jackson Quinn
 Ken Russell as Walter
 David Threlfall as Wicklow
 Klaus Maria Brandauer as Dante/Yakov Saveleyev
 Mac McDonald as Bob
 Nicholas Woodeson as Niki Landau
 Martin Clunes as Brock
 Ian McNeice as Merrydew, Embassy Rep.
 Colin Stinton as Henziger

Production
The Russia House was filmed from October to December 1989, mostly on location in Moscow and Leningrad. It was the first major American production to be filmed substantially in the Soviet Union. The film's opening and closing sequences were filmed on location in Lisbon, Portugal. The sequence at the safe house was shot on Bowen Island, near Vancouver, British Columbia. The remainder of the film was shot in London. The film was shot using an anamorphic process called Technovision.

Soundtrack

The critically acclaimed music to The Russia House was composed and conducted by veteran composer Jerry Goldsmith.  The score featured a mixture of Russian music and jazz to complement the nationalities and characteristics of the two main characters.  There were four main featured soloists, with only one receiving a card on the opening titles - Branford Marsalis on soprano saxophone. Other soloists include a duduk player (an Armenian double reed instrument), pianist Mike Lang and double bassist John Patitucci. A soundtrack album has been released twice. The first edition was released as a film tie in on 11 December 1990 through MCA Records and features 17 tracks of score (including one piece of diegetic (source) music at a running time just over 61 minutes.

 "Katya" (3:57)
 "Introductions" (3:12)
 "The Conversation" (4:13)
 "Training" (2:01)
 "Katya and Barley" (2:32)
 "First Name, Yakov" (2:53)
 "Bon Voyage" (2:11)
 "The Meeting" (3:59)
 "I'm With You" (2:39)
 "Alone in the World"  (4:09) - performed by Patti Austin
 "The Gift" (2:34)
 "Full Marks" (2:27)
 "Barley's Love" (3:24)
 "My Only Country" (4:34)
 "Crossing Over" (4:13)
 "The Deal" (4:09)
 "The Family Arrives" (7:38)

An expanded CD album of just under 76 minutes was released in December 2017 by Quartet Records, which was remastered by Mike Matessino featuring a number of cues not on the original MCA album, one track of three unused cues and an alternate.  The booklet included in the package featured an in depth look at the film and music, by British saxophonist/film music historian/author Dirk Wickenden, incorporating new comments from Mike Lang.  Dirk Wickenden dedicated his liner notes to his saxophonist granddad, George Ernest Tallent (1906 - 1976). The limited edition CD sold out within hours of release but luckily for those who missed it first time around, a non-limited CD edition was issued again by Quartet Records, in August 2021.

 Katya (4:03)
 First Meeting (2:05) - previously unreleased
 The Package / London House / We’ve Got Him (1:37) - unused in the film, previously unreleased
 Introductions (3:16)
 The Conversation (4:17)  
 Portrait of Katya (0:49) - previously unreleased  
 Training (2:05)
 Katya and Barley (2:35)  
 Who Is He? (1:32) - previously unreleased
 First Name, Yakov (2:57)
 All Alone (0:37) - previously unreleased
 Bon Voyage (2:15)
 The Meeting (4:02)
 I'm With You (What Is This Thing Called Love?) (2:42)  
 The Lie Detector (2:17) - previously unreleased
 The Gift (2:38)
 Full Marks (2:32)
 Barley's Love (3:30)
 My Only Country (4:40)
 Crossing Over (4:17)
 The Cemetery (1:17) - previously unreleased
 The Deal (4:14)
 The Family Arrives (7:43)
 Alone in the World (Vocal by Patti Austin) (4:14)
 Barley's Love (Film Version) (3:32) - previously unreleased

Reception
The Russia House received a score of 70% on Rotten Tomatoes based on 20 reviews.

Hal Hinson in The Washington Post wrote: "Making a picture about the political situation in a country as much in flux as the Soviet Union can be disastrous, but the post-glasnost realities here seem plausible and up to the minute. The Russia House doesn't sweep you off your feet; it works more insidiously than that, flying in under your radar. If it is like any of its characters, it's like Katya. It's reserved, careful to declare itself but full of potent surprises. It's one of the year's best films." Peter Travers in Rolling Stone wrote: "At its best, The Russia House offers a rare and enthralling spectacle: the resurrection of buried hopes." Time Out less enthusiastically wrote: "Overtaken by East-West events, and with an over-optimistic ending which sets personal against political loyalty, it's still highly enjoyable, wittily written, and beautiful to behold in places, at others somehow too glossy for its own good."

Tom Stoppard's adapted screenplay was criticised by Vincent Canby in The New York Times: "There is evidence of Mr. Stoppard's wit in the dialogue, but the lines are not easily spoken, which is not to say that they are unspeakable. They are clumsy." Roger Ebert held a similar view in the Chicago Sun-Times: "What's good are the few emotional moments that break out of the weary spy formula: Connery declaring his love for Pfeiffer, or the British and Americans getting on each other's nerves. But these flashes of energy are isolated inside a screenplay that is static and boring, that drones on lifelessly through the le Carré universe, like some kind of space probe that continues to send back random information long after its mission has been accomplished."

Sean Connery was praised for his portrayal of Barley, "bluff, incorrigible, jazz-loving... his finest performance in ages." Variety wrote: "As the flawed, unreliable publisher, Connery is in top form." Peter Travers in Rolling Stone thought he captured "the 'splendid quiet' that le Carré found in Blair." Hal Hinson in The Washington Post wrote: "This may be the most complex character Connery has ever played, and without question it's one of his richest performances. Connery shows the melancholy behind Barley's pickled charm, all the wasted years and unkept promises." Desson Howe, also in The Washington Post, wrote: "Sean Connery, like Anthony Quinn, takes a role like a vitamin pill, downs it, then goes about his bighearted business of making the part his idiosyncratic own." However, he received criticism from the New York Times, who thought that the "usually magnetic Mr. Connery... is at odds with Barley, a glib, lazy sort of man who discovers himself during this adventure. Mr. Connery goes through the movie as if driving in second gear."

Michelle Pfeiffer also garnered critical plaudits for delivering "the film's most persuasive performance... Miss Pfeiffer, sporting a credible Russian accent, brings to it a no-nonsense urgency that is missing from the rest of the movie," according to The New York Times. Desson Howe in The Washington Post wrote: "As Katya, a mother who risks her love to smuggle a document and falls for a Westerner in the process, her gestures are entirely believable, her accent (at least to one set of Western ears) is quietly perfect." Peter Travers in Rolling Stone wrote that "Pfeiffer, who gets more subtle and incisive with each film, is incandescent as Katya." Hal Hinson in The Washington Post congratulated her for portraying a rounded character: "Her triumph goes beyond her facility with the Russian accent; other actresses could have done that. She's great at playing contradictions, at being tough yet yielding, cloaked yet open, direct yet oblique. What's she's playing, we suspect, is the great Russian game of hide-and-seek. But Pfeiffer gives it a personal dimension. Katya holds herself in check, but her wariness, one senses, is as much personal as it is cultural -- the result, perhaps, of her own secret wounds. It's one of the year's most full-blooded performances." However, Pfeiffer also had her detractors. Variety thought that her "Russian accent proves very believable but she has limited notes to play." Time Out wrote that "Pfeiffer can act, but her assumption of a role for which her pouty glamour is inappropriate – a Russian office-worker seen rubbing shoulders in the bus queues – is a jarring note."

Awards and nominations
Fred Schepisi was nominated for the Golden Bear at the 41st Berlin International Film Festival.

Michelle Pfeiffer was nominated for the Golden Globe Award for Best Actress - Motion Picture Drama, but lost to Kathy Bates in Misery (1990).

Home video release 
MGM released The Russia House on DVD on December 26, 2001.

Twilight Time released a limited edition version of the film on Blu-ray on July 12, 2016.  The release included booklet notes by Julie Kirgo, a vintage promotional documentary about the making of the film, a trailer and an isolated score (non diegetic) and source (diegetic) music track.

The film was re-released on Blu-Ray by Sandpiper Pictures on June 14, 2022. Their release included the trailer. It was also a single-layer Blu-Ray, where the previous release had contained a larger file size, on a dual-layer Blu-Ray.

Notes

References

External links 

 
 
 
 
 
 

1990 films
1990s spy films
1990s thriller drama films
American political drama films
American political thriller films
American romantic drama films
American spy films
Cold War spy films
Films about the Secret Intelligence Service
1990s Russian-language films
Films based on works by John le Carré
Films directed by Fred Schepisi
Films set in Lisbon
Films set in Moscow
Films set in the Soviet Union
Films shot in British Columbia
Films shot in Lisbon
Films shot in London
Films shot in Moscow
Films shot in Saint Petersburg
Metro-Goldwyn-Mayer films
Films shot at Pinewood Studios
Films with screenplays by Tom Stoppard
Films scored by Jerry Goldsmith
1990 drama films
Films produced by Paul Maslansky
Films about the KGB
Films about the Central Intelligence Agency
1990s English-language films
1990s American films